Mount Penn is a borough in Berks County, Pennsylvania, United States. The population was 3,106 at the 2010 census. The borough shares a name with a  mountain that rises to the north and overlooks the city of Reading. The peak is sometimes recognized as the southern end of the Reading Prong group of mountains.

Geography
Mount Penn Borough is located in central Berks County at  (40.329359, -75.890691), bordered by the city of Reading to the west. The borough of St. Lawrence borders Mount Penn to the east. The unincorporated community of Pennside lies to the north in Lower Alsace Township. A non-contiguous piece of Lower Alsace Township also borders the south side of Mount Penn.

The borough is in a small saddle between the peak of Mount Penn to the north and  Neversink Mountain to the south.

The Mount Penn Preserve is an area that covers the Mount Penn slopes, north of the borough. Attractions in the Preserve include the Pagoda, the William Penn Memorial Fire Tower, Antietam Lake Park, and numerous businesses and restaurants.

Demographics

As of the census of 2000, there were 3,016 people, 1,278 households, and 829 families residing in the borough. The population density was 7,076.8 people per square mile (2,708.1/km2). There were 1,335 housing units at an average density of 3,132.5 per square mile (1,198.7/km2). The racial makeup of the borough was 96.45% White, 1.06% African American, 0.03% Native American, 1.06% Asian, 0.50% from other races, and 0.90% from two or more races. Hispanic or Latino of any race were 3.38% of the population.

There were 1,278 households, out of which 30.2% had children under the age of 18 living with them, 50.4% were married couples living together, 11.2% had a female householder with no husband present, and 35.1% were non-families. 29.6% of all households were made up of individuals, and 13.7% had someone living alone who was 65 years of age or older. The average household size was 2.35 and the average family size was 2.93.

In the borough the population was spread out, with 24.5% under the age of 18, 6.8% from 18 to 24, 30.7% from 25 to 44, 21.6% from 45 to 64, and 16.3% who were 65 years of age or older. The median age was 37 years. For every 100 females there were 91.6 males. For every 100 females age 18 and over, there were 85.9 males.

The median income for a household in the borough was $41,326, and the median income for a family was $47,917. Males had a median income of $40,603 versus $26,890 for females. The per capita income for the borough was $21,738. About 2.4% of families and 4.4% of the population were below the poverty line, including 4.8% of those under age 18 and 9.5% of those age 65 or over.

Government
Mount Penn is governed by an elected mayor and seven-member Borough Council. The current mayor is Ryan Maurer.

The members of council are

Troy Goodman, President

Richard Lombardo, Vice President

Roger Reto, Council Member

Joseph Cunliffe, Council Member

Roger Stief, Council Member

Shannon Billman, Council Member

Nathan Rupright, Council Member

Transportation

U.S. Route 422 Business is the only numbered highway serving Mount Penn. It follows Perkiomen Avenue through the center of the borough, leading west into downtown Reading and southeast to Pottstown.

References

External links

Borough of Mount Penn official website

Populated places established in 1800
Boroughs in Berks County, Pennsylvania
1800 establishments in Pennsylvania